Malcolm Koonce (born June 6, 1998) is an American football defensive end for the Las Vegas Raiders of the National Football League (NFL). He played college football at Buffalo and was drafted by the Raiders in the third round of the 2021 NFL Draft.

Early life and high school
Koonce grew up in Peekskill, New York, and attended Archbishop Stepinac High School. Although his primary sport at first was rugby, he switched his focus to football after realizing that it could earn him a college scholarship. In 2015, he led Stepinac to a New York State Catholic High School Athletic Association championship.

After graduating, he completed a post-graduate year at Milford Academy in New Berlin, New York.

College career
Koonce was a member of the Buffalo Bulls for four seasons. He served primarily as a backup for his first two seasons. Koonce was named first-team All-Mid-American Conference (MAC) after recording 34 tackles, 11 tackles for loss and nine sacks in his junior season. He was named the Defensive MVP of the 2019 Bahamas Bowl after a two sack performance against the Charlotte 49ers. Koonce repeated as a first-team All-MAC selection as a senior after recording 30 tackles, 6.5 tackles for loss, and five sacks after playing in six games due to the MAC's COVID-19-shortened 2020 season. He became only the fourth UB player to be invited to play in the Senior Bowl.

Professional career

Koonce was selected in the third round with the 79th overall pick of the 2021 NFL Draft by the Las Vegas Raiders. The Raiders had received the 79th pick used to select Koonce in a trade that sent Rodney Hudson to the Arizona Cardinals. On July 23, 2021, Koonce signed his four-year rookie contract with Las Vegas.

Koonce was activated for Week 3 against the Pittsburgh Steelers but did not appear in the game. He was next activated before Week 13 following an injury to linebacker Carl Nassib. Koonce made his NFL debut on December 5 and, despite taking the field for only seven plays on defense and four on special teams, recorded a sack of Washington quarterback Taylor Heinicke.

References

External links
Buffalo Bulls bio

Living people
Players of American football from New York (state)
Sportspeople from Westchester County, New York
American football defensive ends
Buffalo Bulls football players
People from Peekskill, New York
Las Vegas Raiders players
1998 births
Archbishop Stepinac High School alumni